Real Madrid Club de Fútbol C, commonly known as Real Madrid C, was a Spanish association football team that played in the Tercera División – Group 7. It was Real Madrid's second reserve team. They played their home games at La Ciudad del Real Madrid in Valdebebas outside the city of Madrid. At the end of the 2014–15 Tercera División, Real Madrid C was disbanded.

History

Real Madrid Aficionados
Real Madrid Aficionados was the amateur team for Real Madrid. In the 1960s, the team won eight Campeonato de Aficionados (national amateur cup) in an 11-year period, including six in succession. The last of their amateur championships qualified the team for the 1970–71 Copa del Generalísimo; they lost in the second round which was one further than their 'big brothers' at Plus Ultra achieved. The Aficionados last Spanish Cup appearance was in the 1986–87 edition of the Copa del Rey. While Castilla lost in the first round, the amateurs lasted until the round of 16 where they were defeated 1–4 on aggregate by a senior Atlético Madrid side.

In league play, the Aficionados won promotion from the Preferente Castellana to the Tercera División in 1981. Their best year was the 1984–85 season, winning their Tercera group but renouncing their play-off spot in the Promoción de Ascenso.

Real Madrid C
After RFEF rulings about the status of reserve teams, the amateur team was renamed Real Madrid C in 1990. In 1990–91, the team again won their group, but was runner-up in the Liguilla de Ascenso (promotion mini-league). Two years later, the team won promotion to the Segunda División B. In 1997, the team was relegated back to the Tercera when Real Madrid B were demoted from the Segunda División to the Segunda División B. In 2005–06, the team missed promotion to the Segunda B by a single goal; Guijuelo won their home leg 1–0 and lost away 1–2 for 2–2 on aggregate, and the tie was broken by the away goals rule.

Real Madrid C gained promotion in 2012, and maintained an upper-table position in the third tier for two years before being forcibly demoted in 2014 when Castilla were relegated to the third level. After the 2014–15 Tercera División season, the C-team was disbanded.

HonoursTercera División ChampionsWinners (5): 1984–85, 1990–91, 1991–92, 1998–99, 2005–06Copa de la LigaWinners (1): 1982–83 (Copa de la Liga de Tercera División)Campeonato de España de AficionadosWinners (8): 1959–60, 1961–62, 1962–63, 1963–64, 1964–65, 1965–66, 1966–67, 1969–70Copa de ComunidadWinners (2): 2002–03 (Qualified for the Copa Federación where it was eliminated by Real Ávila in the preliminary round 0–2; 2–3), 2007–08 (Qualified for the Copa Federación; eliminated by SS Reyes in the second round 1–0; 0–2)

Season by season
Real Madrid Aficionados8 seasons in Preferente9 seasons in Tercera División

Real Madrid C6 seasons in Segunda División B19''' seasons in Tercera División''

Last squad

Notable players

N.B. Players in BOLD played for the senior team; players in ITALICS have not played in the Primera División.

Notable coaches

References

External links
 Real Madrid C Official club website 
 Futbolme team profile 

1952 establishments in the Community of Madrid
2015 disestablishments in the Community of Madrid
Association football clubs established in 1952
Association football clubs disestablished in 2015
Defunct football clubs in the Community of Madrid
Football clubs in Madrid
Real Madrid Youth Academy